Vladimir Vuković (26 August 1898, Zagreb – 18 November 1975, Zagreb) was a Croatian Jewish chess writer, theoretician, player, arbiter, and journalist.

Chess career
Included in Vuković's tournament record achievements:
 3rd at Celje 1921, behind Stefan Erdélyi and Imre König
 =4–7th at Vienna 1921 tied with Ernst Grünfeld, Savielly Tartakower, and Árpád Vajda; won by Friedrich Sämisch
 1st at Vienna 1921
 =10–11th at Vienna 1922; won by Akiba Rubinstein
 =4–5th at Györ 1924 (Hungarian Chess Championship); won by Géza Nagy
 =4–5th at Debrecen 1925; won by Hans Kmoch
 7th at Kecskemét 1927 (elim., group B); won by Lajos Steiner 
 =6–7th at Kecskemét 1927 (final B); won by Savielly Tartakower
 3rd at Ramsgate 1929, behind Adolf Seitz and Árpád Vajda

He was awarded the International Master (IM) title in 1951 and International Arbiter (IA) in 1952.

He also served as the vice-president of the Croatian Chess Federation.

Writer
Vuković edited the monthly chess magazine Šahovski Glasnik (Chess Journal), the official periodical of the Yugoslavian chess federation.
He is the author of The Art of Attack in Chess (Oxford-London 1963), which is widely regarded as a classic of chess literature. Other books he wrote include Razvoj šahovskih ideja [The development of chess ideas] (Zagreb 1928) and The Chess Sacrifice (London-New York 1968).

Death
Vuković died on November 18, 1975 in Zagreb and was buried at the Mirogoj Cemetery.

References

Bibliography

External links

 

1898 births
1975 deaths
Sportspeople from Zagreb
Burials at Mirogoj Cemetery
Croatian Jews
Austro-Hungarian Jews
Croatian Austro-Hungarians
Croatian chess players
Yugoslav chess players
Jewish chess players
Chess Olympiad competitors
Chess International Masters
Chess arbiters
Croatian chess writers
20th-century chess players